Robert Edward Norton (born October 27, 1960) is an American cultural and intellectual historian who specializes in European, and especially German, history and thought from the Enlightenment to the early twentieth century.

His work ranges across a variety of disciplines, including moral philosophy, political theory, aesthetics, and literary history. He is a professor at the University of Notre Dame.

Education
After obtaining a B.A. in German Language and Literature in 1982 from the University of California, Santa Barbara, Norton received his M.A. and Ph.D. from Princeton University in 1985 and 1988.  He also studied at the Georg-August-Universität Göttingen and the Freie Universität Berlin.

Career
Having taught for nine years at Vassar College in New York, Norton joined Notre Dame in 1998, where he is a professor with appointments in the Departments of German, History, and Philosophy. Norton has also been a guest professor at the Ruprecht-Karls-Universität Heidelberg and the University of Chicago.

In 1997, Norton was awarded a fellowship from the John Simon Guggenheim Memorial Foundation. He won the Jacques Barzun Prize in Cultural History awarded by the American Philosophical Society in 2003 for his book, Secret Germany. Stefan George and His Circle. His translation of Ernst Bertram's Nietzsche. Attempt at a Mythology was selected by the American Translators Association for the Ungar German Translation Award in 2011.

Major publications 
 The Crucible of German Democracy. Ernst Troeltsch and the First World War. (Mohr Siebeck, 2021). ISBN 978-3-16-159828-9.
 Secret Germany. Stefan George and His Circle. (Cornell UP, 2002). ISBN 978-0801433542.
 The Beautiful Soul. Aesthetic Morality in the Eighteenth Century. (Cornell UP, 1995). ISBN 978-0801430503.
 Herder's Aesthetics and the European Enlightenment. (Cornell UP, 1991).  ISBN 978-0801425301.
 Translation of Ernst Bertram, Nietzsche. Attempt at a Mythology. (Illinois UP, 2009). ISBN 978-0252076015.
Translation of Ulrich Ricken, Linguistics, Anthropology and Philosophy in the French Enlightenment (Routledge, 1994) ISBN 9780203219799.

References

External links 
 

University of Notre Dame faculty
20th-century American historians
German–English translators
21st-century American historians
21st-century American translators
Princeton University faculty
Historians of Germany
Vassar College faculty
Germanists
Living people
University of California, Santa Barbara alumni
1960 births
21st-century American male writers
20th-century American male writers